Never Broke Again (also known as Never Broke Again, LLC), often abbreviated as NBA, is a record label imprint from Baton Rouge, Louisiana, founded by American rapper Kentrell "YoungBoy Never Broke Again" Gaulden, Rodrick "OG3Three" Jeanpierre and Kyle "Montana" Claiborne in 2015 through Atlantic Records; however, it is now distributed through Universal Music Group with their deal with Motown Records. The group is home to recording artists such as rappers Quando Rondo, NoCap, and several other up and coming artists from Louisiana and Georgia.

History
The NBA label was originally a part of Atlantic Records' when YoungBoy Never Broke Again signed his 5-year record deal with the label and music had begun being officially licensed to a company titled Never Broke Again, LLC. The label has since grown to be independent of Atlantic and is now signed under Motown Records who distribute their music. However, the label also releases independently from Motown through UnitedMasters.

On May 17, 2017, the label released its first compilation project, Extortion Season, distributed by Empire. The project sees appearances from Never Broke Again artists such as NBA Big B, NBA KD, and the label's co-founder, OG 3Three. The collective released their second project together, Ain't 2 Long, which was distributed through UnitedMasters. The compilation sees appearances from D-Dawg, Meechy Baby, NBA Ben 10, NBA Big B, NoCap, Phat Black, P Yungin, Quando Rondo, RJAE, Rojay MLP, and the label's co-founder, YoungBoy Never Broke Again.

On September 8, 2021, following the promotion of Ethiopia Habtemariam to the Chairman and CEO of Motown Records in March, it was announced that Never Broke Again and Motown Records would enter a joint venture deal and the label would be led by Youngboy and Kyle "Montana" Clairborne. When asked in an interview, Habtemariam spoke on her decision to ink the deal with the label:

YoungBoy noted that for him, the deal had come into place because he "had a responsibility to [his] artists to make sure to find the right partner for [his] label." Clairborne noted that his decision was influenced by the fact that "Motown has been an inspiration for generations – a place that helps develop artist, songwriters and business executives." Maurice "Kenoe" Jordan, a Grammy Awards winning producer and the vice president of A&R of Motown noted that his decision to proceed with the deal was influenced by the fact he is also from Baton Rouge, Louisiana and due to that he has "a great understanding of one another and this partnership was always something that I wanted to bring to Motown." He also noted that "YoungBoy is an incredible visionary whose confidence in his artistry is only outdone by his dedication and work ethic. I’m excited to welcome them into Motown and help bring the Never Broke Again label and brand to the next level."

Following the label's joint venture deal, Never Broke Again released their first project under the label, Never Broke Again: The Compilation, Vol. 1 on November 19, 2023. The eighteen-track project features artists such as Big B, RJae, NoCap, Meechy Baby, P Yungin, RoJay, Herm, Quando Rondo, and NBA YoungBoy, the label's primarily pushed artists.

On June 10, 2022, the label released its first project of the year, Never Broke Again Presents: Green Flag Activity, the title dedicated to the infamous green flags which they use to represent themselves. The sixteen-track album was preceded by two singles, "Pull Up Actin" by YoungBoy Never Broke Again and P Yungin which was released on April 1, 2022, and "Gang Baby" by YoungBoy Never Broke Again and P Yungin featuring RJAE and Rojay MLP. The collective's second project of the year, the Halloween themed Never Broke Again: Nightmare on 38th St was released on October 28, 2022. It was preceded by one single, "Searching" by NBA Ben 10. The project only featured artists from YoungBoy's hometown, Baton Rouge.

Roster

Current

In-house producers 
 Jason "Cheese" Goldberg
 Samuel "Khris James" Thanni

Discography

Studio Albums

Compilation albums

Singles

Artist releases

Studio albums

Extended plays

Compilation albums

Mixtapes

References

External links
 Never Broke Again on Instagram
 Never Broke Again on Twitter
 Never Broke Again on TikTok
 Never Broke Again on Spotify

American record labels
Contemporary R&B record labels
Hip hop record labels
Record labels established in 2015
Music publishing companies of the United States
Companies based in Baton Rouge, Louisiana